Sir Thomas Malet (1582–1665) was an English judge and politician who sat in the House of Commons between 1614 and 1628. He was Solicitor general to Queen Henrietta Maria.

Life
Malet was of Poyntington, Somerset and also inherited lands in Somerset known as St Audries. He was trained in the law at the Middle Temple and called to the bar in 1606.

In 1614 he was elected Member of Parliament for Tregony in the Addled Parliament and re-elected for Tregony in 1621. He was returned for Newtown, IoW in 1625 and 1626.

He became judge of assize in 1641.  In March 1642 he encouraged the Kentish grand jury to petition Parliament in favour of the Book of Common Prayer and against depriving the King of control of the militia. He was imprisoned in the Tower of London for two years until he was exchanged for Sir John Temple. He then joined the Royal Court at Oxford.

At the Restoration, he was restored in 1660 to his judgeship. He was granted a warrant for a baronetcy, but did not take it up.

Malet died at the age of 82, leaving the estate to his son John.

Family
Malet married Jane Mylles, daughter of Francis Mylles. His sons John and Michael were MPs after the Restoration. His second son Baldwin was killed in the Civil War at the age of 20. His daughter Dorothy married firstly Sir Thomas Palmer of Fairfield, Stogursey, Somerset; and secondly Sir Ralph Grey (1552–1623)—their son Edward Grey was of Ulgham Grange, Northumberland.

References

1582 births
1665 deaths
Politicians from Dorset
Justices of the King's Bench
17th-century English judges
Prisoners in the Tower of London
Members of the Parliament of England for Tregony
English MPs 1614
English MPs 1621–1622